Lina Maria Magull (born 15 August 1994) is a German footballer who plays as a midfielder for Bayern Munich and the Germany national team.

Club career

Youth career
Lina Magull started her youth career playing for Hörder SC from 1999 to 2002. She spent the next six years with Hombrucher SV where she played in an all-boy team. In 2008, she moved in the course of her appointment at the girls' boarding school of the Football and Athletics Association of Westfalia in SuS Kaiserau's youth team C (boys).

Senior career
One year later she started her senior career with the second division side FSV Gütersloh 2009 and helped them gain the promotion to the Bundesliga. In the season 2012/13 Magull signed a contract with VfL Wolfsburg. She made her Frauen-Bundesliga debut on 23 September 2012 in the devastating 6–0 victory against VfL Sindelfingen. Just four days later, she successfully came on to make her Champions League debut in VfL Wolfsburg's 5–1 away win against the Polish club Unia Racibórz. On 14 November 2012, Magull scored her first league goal for VfL Wolfsburg against her former club Gütersloh in a game which eventually ended with 10–0 victory to Wolfsburg.
She won the 2012–13 treble with Wolfsburg. On 12 November 2014, Magull scored two goals against SV Neulengbach to help Wolfsburg past through to the quarter-final of the 2014-15 UEFA Women's Champions League.

On 21 May 2015, she extended her contract with Wolfsburg which will keep her at the German club until 2018. In addition, she was also loaned out to play for the Bundesliga side SC Freiburg so that she will have more chances to develop her career. In May 2016, her loan at SC Freiburg was extended for another year, running until 2017.

International career
Lina Magull has been chosen to represent junior teams by the German Football Association since 2008. In 2010 and 2011, she played in the UEFA Women's Under-17 Championship and finished in the third place respectively. She participated in the German squad competing in the 2012 FIFA U-20 Women's World Cup in Japan. In the second group game against Ghana, Magull scored the only winning goal in injury time of the second half to help Germany secure their place in the quarter-final. Germany eventually reached the final but lost 1–0 to the United States. In 2013, she played in the 2013 UEFA Women's Under-19 Championship in Wales and reached the semi-finals, where her Germany were defeated 2–1 by France. In her second FIFA U-20 Women's World Cup in Canada, Germany, under Magull's captaincy, became the champions after a 1–0 victory after extra time against Nigeria.

On 13 October 2015, Magull (along with Mandy Islacker) was called up to the Germany senior team for the first time in preparation for the two UEFA Women's Euro 2017 qualifiers against Russia and Turkey.
At the 2019 Women's World Cup, she scored a goal in Germany's 4–0 win over South Africa. She scored Germany's lone goal in their 2-1 quarterfinal defeat against Sweden.

Career statistics

Scores and results list Germany's goal tally first, score column indicates score after each Magull goal.

Honours
VfL Wolfsburg
UEFA Women's Champions League: 2012–13, 2013–14
Bundesliga: 2012–13, 2013–14
DFB-Pokal: 2012–13, 2014–15

Bayern Munich
Bundesliga: 2020–21
Germany

 UEFA Women's Championship runner-up: 2022

Germany U20
FIFA U-20 Women's World Cup: 2014; runner-up 2012

Individual
Fritz Walter Medal: Silver 2012

References

External links
Profile on UEFA.com

1994 births
Living people
Footballers from Dortmund
VfL Wolfsburg (women) players
SC Freiburg (women) players
FC Bayern Munich (women) players
German women's footballers
Germany women's international footballers
Women's association football midfielders
2019 FIFA Women's World Cup players
Frauen-Bundesliga players
FSV Gütersloh 2009 players
UEFA Women's Euro 2022 players
UEFA Women's Euro 2017 players